Hoàng Yến Chibi (born 8 December 1995 in Hanoi) is a Vietnamese singer, actress, and model. She lives in Ho Chi Minh City.

Life and career
Hoàng Yến Chibi was born in Hanoi, Vietnam on 8 December 1995. She had a good singing voice when she was young. In 2014, she became famous for singing a song "Ngây ngô". Hoàng Yến Chibi won the second prize in the show "Học viện ngôi sao 2014", and the first prize in the show "Tôi là diễn viên 2015". She decided to pursue her singing career and acting career. She moved to Ho Chi Minh City for living and working. She appeared in several movies, television films and television shows.

Songs
Ngây ngô
Ta nói nó dzui
Lại gần em – Close to me
Ngưng làm bạn
Đồi hoa mặt trời
By my side
Anh nói em nghe đi
Cinderella
Bỏ mặc quá khứ
Điều ngốc nghếch nhất
Nụ hôn đánh rơi
No boyfriend
Thanh Xuân Của Cô Gái Nhà bên
Cánh Hoa Tổn Thương

Filmography
Cửa sổ thủy tinh
Trại cá sấu
Gia đình ngũ quả
Ám ảnh – Obsession
Lộc phát
Hot girl làm vợ
Mãi mãi là bao lâu
4 năm, 2 chàng, 1 tình yêu (vi)
Cô gái đến từ hôm qua – The Girl from Yesterday
Tháng năm rực rỡ (Go-Go Sisters)
Kế hoạch đổi chồng

Awards and nominations

Music

Movie

References

External links
Hoàng Yến Chibi Official at YouTube
Hoàng Yến Chibi at Internet Movie Database
Hoàng Yến Chibi at Facebook

1995 births
Living people
21st-century Vietnamese women singers
Vietnamese pop singers
Vietnamese film actresses
Vietnamese television actresses
People from Hanoi